South Korean singer and songwriter Kang Daniel has released one studio album (which was reissued under a different title), five extended plays (EPs) — four of which were Korean and one of which was Japanese — and 23 singles (including two features, five promotional singles, and four soundtrack appearances). As of December 2022, Kang has sold 1.8 million albums as a solo artist and an additional 4.2 million as a part of Wanna One. 

Following the end of Wanna One's activities as a group, Kang released his first solo EP, Color on Me, in July 2019 under his newly formed one-man agency Konnect Entertainment. The EP debuted at number one on South Korea's Gaon Album Chart and entered Japan's Oricon Albums Chart at number 23. It also broke two records selling over 500,000 physical copies within the first month of its release. In March 2020, Kang released his second EP, Cyan, as the first installment of his "color trilogy" project. It peaked atop South Korea's Gaon Album Chart with its lead single "2U" giving Kang his first top ten track in Korea, which peaked at number seven on the Gaon Digital Chart. His third EP, Magenta, was released in August 2020 and served as the second installment of his three-part color series. The digital single "Paranoia", released in February 2021, marked Kang's first solo appearance on Billboard'''s World Digital Song Sales chart with the single debuting at number five. It also gave Kang his first top five track in Korea, which peaked at number two on the Gaon Digital Chart. In April 2021, Kang released his fourth overall EP, Yellow'', as the final installment of his three-part project aimed to find his true colors as a solo artist. It peaked atop South Korea's Gaon Album Chart with its lead single "Antidote" giving Kang his first number one track on South Korea's Gaon Digital Chart.

Studio albums

Reissues

Extended plays

Singles

As lead artist

As featured artist

Promotional

Soundtrack appearances

Other charted songs

Songwriting credits
All credits are adapted from the Korea Music Copyright Association, unless otherwise referenced.

Music videos

Notes

References

Discography
Discographies of South Korean artists
K-pop discographies